Lille OSC (Lille Olympique Sporting Club) is a French women's football club based in Villeneuve-d'Ascq. The club is the female section of Ligue 1 men's club Lille OSC. The club was founded in 2005. Since 2017, they currently play in the Division 2 Féminine, the Second division of women's football in France.

History  
The club was formally founded in 2005 after an agreement between FF Templemars-Vendeville and Lille OSC. The team played several years in Division 2 Féminine until 2017, when LOSC won the D2 championships and was then promoted to Division 1 Féminine.
At the end of their first D1 season, the team achieved 6th place.

Players

First team squad

References

External links 
 Official website 

Women's football clubs in France
Association football clubs established in 2005
2005 establishments in France
Division 1 Féminine clubs
Lille OSC
Villeneuve-d'Ascq
Sport in Nord (French department)
Football clubs in Hauts-de-France